Talkin' Dirty After Dark is a 1991 American comedy film written and directed by Topper Carew and starring Martin Lawrence. In addition to Lawrence the film also stars John Witherspoon, Tom Lister, Jr., and Mark Curry.

The film was released in February 1991 and went on to gross one million dollars at the box office; it was only available in limited release. The film was generally panned by critics.

The film was shot on location in Los Angeles, California.

Synopsis
Stand-up comedian, Terry Lumbar, is a local funny man who is in a lot of trouble. He can't pay his $67 phone bill. He drives a car that has only one gear, reverse.  He is struggling trying to make it at a local comedy club called Dukie's. Finally, he is having an affair with the owner's wife in an attempt to get more attention at the club.

It turns out that the owner, Dukie, is trying to hook up with the star attraction of his club, Aretha, whose boyfriend threatens to hurt anybody who laughs at her. What follows is a night of comedy, romance, comedy, action, comedy, and Terry achieving his initial goal: getting $67 to pay his phone bill.

Cast
Martin Lawrence as Terry Lumbar
Lance Crouther as Brother Kwame
Mark Curry as Antonio
Ken Davitian as Seat Mate
Jedda Jones as Rubie Lin
Renée Jones as Kimmie
Cici Lau as Chinese Waitress
Tommy Lister as Bigg
Robin Montague as Bad Girl #2
Darryl Sivad as Percy
Toukie Smith as Waitress
Phyllis Yvonne Stickney as Aretha
Joe Torry as Audience Member
Rodney Winfield as Rudy Ray
John Witherspoon as Dukie
Marvin Wright-Bey as Jackie, Dookies Night Club Manager
Dwayne Kennedy as Brother Roach

References

External links
 
 
 

1991 films
1991 comedy films
African-American comedy films
American comedy films
Films shot in Los Angeles
New Line Cinema films
1991 directorial debut films
Films about comedians
1990s English-language films
1990s American films